A system of plant taxonomy, the Eichler system was the first phylogenetic (phyletic) or evolutionary system.  It was developed by August W. Eichler (1839–1887), initially in his Blüthendiagramme (1875–1878) and then in successive editions of his Syllabus (1876–1890). After his death his colleague Adolf Engler (1844–1930) continued its development, and it became widely accepted.

The system was based on dividing the plant kingdom into those plants with concealed reproductive organs (non-floral), the (Cryptogamae, = hidden reproduction) and those with visible reproductive organs (floral), the (Phanerogamae, = visible reproduction). Moreover, Eichler was the first taxonomist to separate the Phanerogamae into Angiosperms and Gymnosperms and the former into Monocotyledonae and Dicotyledonae. His primary ranks were Divisions (Abtheilung), followed by orders (Reihe).

Blüthendiagramme (1875–1878)

Volume I (1875) 

Contents pp. VI–VIII
Synopsis:
 Division I Gymnospermae p. 54
 Division II Monocotyledoneae p. 73
 Division III Dicotyledoneae p. 187 (part)

Volume II (1878) 

Contents pp. V–VIII
Synopsis:
 Division III Dicotyledoneae p. 187 (continued)

Syllabus (Fourth edition 1886) 

The system (here taken from the 4th edition of the Syllabus, 1886) divides plants into divisions, classes and groups. Groups were further divided into orders.
 Note: ranks translated into Latin

Outline: p. 6. Page numbers refer to text

 A. Cryptogamae
 division I. Thallophyta
 classis I. Algae
 group I. Cyanophyceae
 group II. Diatomeae
 group III. Chlorophyceae p. 8
 group IV. Phaeophyceae
 group V. Rhodophyceae
 classis II. Fungi
 group I. Schizomycetes
 group II. Eumycetes
 group III. Lichenes
 division II. Bryophyta
 classis I. Hepaticae
 classis II. Musci
 division III. Pteridophyta p. 21
 classis I. Equisetinae
 classis II. Lycopodinae
 classis III. Filicinae
 B. Phanerogamae
 division I. Gymnospermae p. 33
 division II. Angiospermae p. 34
 classis I. Monocotyleae (7 orders) p. 34
 order I. Liliiflorae p. 34
 ordo II. Enantioblastae
 ordo III. Spadiciflorae
 ordo IV. Glumiflorae
 ordo V. Scitamineae
 ordo VI. Gynandreae
 classis II. Dicotyleae p. 39
 subclassis I. Choripetalae
 subclassis II. Sympetalae p. 58

Class Monocotyleae 
 order I. Liliiflorae p. 34 (6 families)
 1. Liliaceae (3 subfamilies)
 a. Lilieae
 Tulipa Gagea Fritillaria Lilium Ornithogalum Allium Hyacinthus Asphodelus Aloë 
 b. Melanthieae
  Colchicum Veratrum Tofieldia 
 c. Smilaceae
 Paris Convallaria Asparagus Smilax 
 2. Amaryllidaceae p. 35
 Galanthus Leucojum Narcissus Agave
 3. Juncaceae p. 35
 4. Iridaceae p. 35
 5. Haemodoraceae p. 35
 6. Dioscoreaceae p. 35
 7. Bromeliaceae p. 35
 ordo II. Enantioblastae p. 35
 ordo III. Spadiciflorae p. 36
 ordo IV. Glumiflorae p. 36
 ordo V. Scitamineae p. 38
 ordo VI. Gynandreae p. 38

See also 
 Phylogenetic system

References

Bibliography

Works by Eichler
 
 Volume I: 1875
 Volume II: 1878 
 Syllabus der Vorlesungen über Phanerogamenkunde  Lipsius und Tischer, Kiel 1876.
 Subsequent editions published as Syllabus der Vorlesungen über specielle und medicinisch-pharmaceutische Botanik, 2nd ed. 1880, 3rd ed. 1883, 4th ed. 1886, 5th 1890
 
 
 Outline: p. 1

Other
  in  volume 2(2).
 
 
 
 
 
 

system, Eichler
Systems of algal taxonomy
Systems of fungus taxonomy